Donald Campbell (1751 – 5 June 1804), of Barbreck, Argyll, was a Scottish traveller in India and the Middle East.

Life
Campbell published in London in 1795 A Journey over land to India... by Donald Campbell of Barbreck, who formerly commanded a regiment of cavalry in the service of the Nabob of the Carnatic: in a series of letters to his son. The journey was made by way of Belgium, the Tyrol, Venice, Alexandria, Aleppo, Diyarbekr, Mosul, Baghdad, Bushire, Bombay, and Goa. He was shipwrecked in the Indian Ocean and made prisoner by Hyder Ali but was subsequently released. The book enjoyed much popularity. A new edition appeared in 1796, in quarto, like the first; in the same year an abridged version was published, in octavo, with the title Narrative of Adventures and a preface signed' 'S. J.' The third part of the travels, relating to Campbell's shipwreck and imprisonment, was published as a Chapbook, Shipwreck and Captivity of D. C. (London, 1800).

He also published Letter to the Marquis of Lorn on the Present Times (London, 1798), protesting party factions in connection with the war with France.

Campbell died at Hutton, Essex, on 5 June 1804. He left a son, Frederick William Campbell.

Dictionary of Indian Biography citation
CAMPBELL, DONALD (1751-1804)
Captain of a Cavalry regiment in the service of the Nawab of the Carnatic at the age of 30 he made a journey to India and published an account of it, 1795 travelled via Venice, Trieste, Zante, Alexandria, Cyprus, Aleppo, Badgad, Russia and Bushire by sea to Bombay and Goa shipwrecked on the coast on his way to Madras captured by Hyder All's soldiers and imprisoned at Hydernagar, in company with one Hall, to whom he was chained. Hall died in prison, and his gaoler refused to remove the corpse for several days eventually, on General Matthew's approach, he was released in order to negotiate with him on behalf of Hyat Singh, Hyder's General with despatches for the Governments of Bombay and Madras, he proceeded by sea to Anjengo, travelled by land through Travancore, Tinnevelly, Madura, Trichinopoly, Tanjore to Negapatam, and Madras with Lord Macartney's permission, went on to Calcutta and, on behalf of Hyat Singh, negotiated with Warren Hastings returned overland to Madras and Anjengo thence by sea to Bombay again visited Madras and China, and returned to England in 1785, after four years' absence died 5 June 1804.

References

1751 births
1804 deaths
Scottish explorers
18th-century Scottish people
19th-century Scottish people
Scottish travel writers
People from Argyll and Bute
18th-century Scottish writers
19th-century Scottish writers
People of the Scottish Enlightenment